William Henry Fairfax Calvert (14 February 1871 – 8 June 1942) was an Australian politician.

He was born in South Arm, Tasmania. In 1924 he was elected to the Tasmanian Legislative Council as the independent member for Huon, succeeding his brother David. He held the seat until his retirement in 1942; he died a month later in Hobart.

References

1871 births
1942 deaths
Independent members of the Parliament of Tasmania
Members of the Tasmanian Legislative Council